The 2008 Legg Mason Tennis Classic was a men's tennis tournament played on outdoor hard courts. It was the 40th edition of the Legg Mason Tennis Classic, and was part of the International Series of the 2008 ATP Tour. It took place at the William H.G. FitzGerald Tennis Center in Washington, D.C., United States, from August 9 through August 17, 2008.

The singles were led by ATP No. 9, San Jose and Dubai titlist, Los Angeles finalist, and defending champion Andy Roddick, winner of back-to-back titles in Stuttgart, Kitzbühel and Los Angeles Juan Martín del Potro, and Dubai finalist and Wimbledon quarterfinalist Feliciano López. Other seeds were Indian Wells quarterfinalist Tommy Haas, Indian Wells runner-up and Los Angeles semifinalist Mardy Fish, Marat Safin, Marc Gicquel and Marcel Granollers.

Finals

Singles

 Juan Martín del Potro defeated  Viktor Troicki, 6–3, 6–3
 It was Juan Martín del Potro's 4th title of the year, and overall.

Doubles

 Marc Gicquel /  Robert Lindstedt defeated  Bruno Soares /  Kevin Ullyett, 7–6(8–6), 6–3

References

External links
Official website
Singles draw
Doubles draw